Eori is a privately held island, which lies at the extreme northwestern end of the Mamanuca Islands group.

Geography
It has an area of 9.7 hectares (24 acres) and was advertised as being for lease in April 2008 with a price of €9,000,000. In 2009 it was offered at auction but failed to sell at a top bid of A$1 million.

Ownership
Eori was for many years owned by real estate firm Pacific Islands Partnership Limited, which is in turn solely owned by Tim Manning's Chaylor Investments. Chaylor investor Eric Rush held a 7 percent share in Eori specifically.

In 2009, Manning and Chaylor sold the island to investor Graeme Hart., who controls the island through a 100% interest in LLC Eori Island Limited via his  personal investment corporation, Rank Group Ltd.

See also

 Desert island
 List of islands of Fiji

References

External links
 Commercial real estate listing for Eori Island
 Paradise can wait for bids, New Zealand Herald, Sunday Jul 5, 2009

Uninhabited islands of Fiji
Ba Province
Mamanuca Islands
Private islands of Fiji